Ernst Roland Sandberg (born 16 December 1946) is a Swedish former professional footballer who played as a striker. Starting off his career with Kalmar FF in 1966, he went on to represent Åtvidabergs FF, 1. FC Kaiserslautern, and BK Häcken before his retirement in 1981. A full international between 1969 and 1976, he won 37 caps and scored 15 goals for the Sweden national team. He was a part of the Sweden team that finished fifth at the 1974 FIFA World Cup.

Club career 
Born in Karlskrona, Sandberg began his footballing career with Jämjö GoIF and Lyckeby GoIF before signing with Kalmar FF in 1955. In 1970, he signed with Åtvidabergs FF with which he won two Allsvenskan titles, two Svenska Cupen titles, and was the Allsvenskan top scorer in both 1971 and 1972. In 1973, he signed with German Bundesliga outfit 1. FC Kaiserslautern, where he spent four years and contributed with 60 goals in 118 league games. After a career-threatening knee injury in 1976, he retired from professional football the following year. In 1979, after a new surgery, Sandberg made his footballing comeback and spent the last couple of seasons of his career with his former club Kalmar FF as well as a brief stint with BK Häcken in 1981 before he once again was forced to retire because of his knee problems.

International career

Youth 
Sandberg represented the Sweden U21 team a total of six times between 1969 and 1972, scoring 3 goals.

Senior 
Sandberg made his full international debut for Sweden on 6 August 1969, replacing Leif Eriksson at halftime in a friendly 1–0 win against the Soviet Union. He scored his first international goal during the 1968–71 Nordic Football Championship in a 3–0 win against Norway on 8 August 1971. He represented Sweden at the 1974 FIFA World Cup, where he scored goals against Uruguay and West Germany as Sweden finished fifth. He won his 37th and final cap in a 1978 FIFA World Cup qualifier against Norway on 16 June 1976, being replaced by Jan Mattsson in the 37th minute after sustaining a serious knee injury.

Career statistics

International 

 Scores and results list Sweden's goal tally first, score column indicates score after each Sandberg goal.

Honours
Åtvidabergs FF

 Allsvenskan: 1972, 1973

1. FC Kaiserslautern
 DFB-Pokal finalist: 1975–76
Individual
 Allsvenskan top scorer: 1971, 1972 (shared with Ralf Edström)
 Stor Grabb: 1973

References

External links

 

1946 births
Living people
Swedish footballers
Sweden international footballers
Swedish expatriate footballers
Allsvenskan players
Åtvidabergs FF players
BK Häcken players
Kalmar FF players
1. FC Kaiserslautern players
Expatriate footballers in West Germany
1974 FIFA World Cup players
Bundesliga players
Association football forwards
People from Karlskrona
Sportspeople from Blekinge County
Swedish expatriate sportspeople in West Germany